Po Binnasuar was a king of Panduranga, ruling from 1316/1328 to 1361/1373. Panduranga was a medieval Cham principality located in present-day Southeastern Vietnam.

Dorohiem and Dohamide in their 1965 history Dân tộc Chàm lược sử incorrectly assume Po Binnasuar with the profile of Chế Bồng Nga.

References

Kings of Champa
1369 deaths
1373 deaths
Year of birth unknown